Henrylygus ultranubilus is a species of plant bug in the family Miridae. It is found in North America.

References

 Schwartz, Michael D., and Robert G. Foottit (1998). "Revision of the Nearctic species of the genus Lygus Hahn, with a review of the Palaearctic species (Heteroptera: Miridae)". Memoirs on Entomology, International, vol. 10, vii + 428.
 Thomas J. Henry, Richard C. Froeschner. (1988). Catalog of the Heteroptera, True Bugs of Canada and the Continental United States. Brill Academic Publishers.

Further reading

External links

 NCBI Taxonomy Browser, Henrylygus ultranubilus

Insects described in 1917
Mirini